Daniel R. Cullinane is an American politician formerly serving in the Massachusetts House of Representatives from September 2013 to December 2020. He is a Boston resident from the neighborhood of Dorchester and a member of the Massachusetts Democratic Party.
Cullinane resigned on December 13, 2020, to become a lobbyist at Kearney, Donovan & McGee.

See also
 2019–2020 Massachusetts legislature

References

Living people
Democratic Party members of the Massachusetts House of Representatives
Politicians from Boston
21st-century American politicians
Year of birth missing (living people)